Hurricane Adrian caused generally minor damage along its path in mid-June 1999, though it left six people dead in its wake. The first tropical cyclone and first hurricane of the well below-average 1999 Pacific hurricane season, Adrian formed out of a broad area of low pressure south of the Gulf of Tehuantepec that persisted for several days. The disturbance was intertwined with a tropical wave that departed the western coast of Africa on June 5, and both features congealed into a tropical depression by early on June 18. The nascent cyclone paralleled the southwestern coastline of Mexico, intensifying into Tropical Storm Adrian shortly after formation and attaining its peak as a Category 2 hurricane with winds of 100 mph (160 km/h) late on July 20. Though remaining offshore, it resulted in minor flooding and insignificant damage to infrastructure. Four people were killed by a large wave along the coastline of Chiapas, and an additional two people were killed in Durango while trying to cross a flooded river in a pick-up truck; a five-year-old girl accompanying the men went missing. Wind shear and cooler ocean temperatures weakened Adrian as it produced minor damage on Socorro Island, and the system ultimately degenerated into a remnant low late on June 22.

Meteorological history

In mid-June, a broad cyclonic area of cloudiness persisted to the south of the Gulf of Tehuantepec. A low-level circulation and banding features became more prominent on June 16, and further development was aided by the presence of a tropical wave that first departed the western coastline of Africa on June 5. As extremely deep convection festered within a band west of the disturbance's center, it is estimated the first tropical depression of the season formed around 06:00 UTC on June 18, located about 260 mi (420 km) southeast of Acapulco, Mexico. The newly-formed cyclone tracked west-northwest parallel to the coastline, steered by a strong area of high pressure to its north and east.

Moderate easterly wind shear that had been affecting the developing system began to relax almost immediately after formation, allowing upper-level outflow to expand in most directions and the depression to intensify into Tropical Storm Adrian. A small central dense overcast materialized early on June 19, followed shortly thereafter by hints of an eye-like feature. Thus, in accordance with increasing satellite intensity estimates, Adrian was upgraded to the season's first hurricane by 00:00 UTC on June 20 while located about 485 mi (780 km) south-southeast of the southern tip of the Baja California Peninsula. The storm further organized to attain its peak as a Category 2 hurricane with winds of 100 mph (160 km/h) as the aforementioned eye-like feature became readily apparent in satellite imagery.

Following peak intensity, Adrian's cloud pattern became less symmetric, its eye became obscured, and its convection warmed as southeasterly wind shear increased and the storm passed over ocean temperatures near 77 °F (25 °C). The storm slowed as it passed near Socorro Island, all the while the continued unfavorable regime weakened Adrian and stripped it of its all convection. The system was reduced to an exposed swirl of clouds over the open East Pacific by late on June 22.

Preparations and impact

In preparation for the cyclone, the port of Acapulco was closed to all vessels. The government of Michoacán organized shelters to house up to 5,000 people, while surrounding states were placed on alert.

Two highway bridges and a railway bridge were damaged by flooding near the Guatemala border. Passing very near Socorro Island on June 21, Adrian produced peak winds of 45 mph (72 km/h) there, potentially damaging weather monitoring equipment. Along the southern coastline of Chiapas, four people were swept away and drowned by a large wave, while farther inland in northwestern Durango, two men died and a five-year-old girl went missing after attempting to cross a river in a pick-up truck. Along the central coastline of Michoacán, a powerful hailstorm demolished many homes and left around 2,000 people homeless. A 1.2 mi (2 km) stretch of coastal road was ruined in the city of Tecomán. The outer bands of the hurricane produced heavy rainfall peaking at 15.75 in (400 mm) in the municipality of Coyutla; minor flooding was reported across Coahuila and Colima.

See also

1999 Pacific hurricane season
Hurricane Cosme (2013)

References

External links

Hurricane Adrian advisory archive
Hurricane Adrian Preliminary Report

1999 Pacific hurricane season
Category 2 Pacific hurricanes
Pacific hurricanes in Mexico